Musée Automobile Reims-Champagne, (Reims Automobile Museum), is a motor museum located in Reims. It was founded in 1985 to house the collection of Philippe Charbonneaux.

Description
The museum was founded in 1985 to house the collection of Philippe Charbonneaux. The premises at 84 Avenue Georges Clémenceau, 51100 Reims, house the fifth largest vehicle collection in France, with 230 cars and motor bikes dating from 1908.

The collection

Cars

The collection includes: Amilcar, Berliet, Chenard-Walcker, CIME, Citroën, DB, De Dion-Bouton, Delage, Delahaye, Panhard, Peugeot, Renault, Salmson, Simca and Talbot.

Motorcycles
The motorcycle collection includes: BSA, Condor, Gillet, Monet-Goyon, Motobécane, Norton, NSU, Soyer, Terrot, and Triumph.

Toys
Sections of the museum are devoted to toys and pedal-cars.

Administration
The museum is currently managed by an association of collectors.

References

External links
 Official site of the Musée Automobile Reims Champagne

Museums established in 1985
Automobile museums in France
1985 establishments in France
Motorcycle museums